Phoenix FM is a community radio station serving the areas of Brentwood and Billericay, England on 98.0FM and online, covering an area of over 140,000 people.

History
The station was formed in 1996 and has been broadcasting full-time on FM since 23 March 2007, having completed twelve 28-day restricted service licence broadcasts on FM between 1996 and 2006.

On 16 February 2006, Ofcom announced that Phoenix FM, after ten years of campaigning, had been awarded a full-time Community Radio licence.

Having previously set up studios in Ongar Road, The Hermitage and Hutton Poplars Lodge, Phoenix FM moved its base of operations to the Baytree Centre in early 2007 and started broadcasting full-time on 98.0 FM at 7p.m. on Friday 23 March 2007.  The station moved to its current base at the Brentwood Centre in February 2012.

The station's broadcasts have provided a valuable platform for local bands looking to gain airtime. Inme, who were then known under the name of Drowned, were one band whose first radio play and interviews were on the station.

The station's Creative Sessions have given studio recording time to unknown and young local bands as well as featuring established recording artists such as Republica,  Imogen Heap, Turin Brakes, Salad, Echobelly, Midway Still, Chris T-T and MJ Hibbett.

Phoenix FM was also the first community radio station in the UK to provide a streaming internet service, in 2001.

Notable current and former presenters

 Snooker player Ronnie O'Sullivan, who presented the Midweek Matchzone show with Chris Hood between 2015 and 2018.
 Snooker player Steve Davis, who has been presenting the Interesting Alternative show since 1996, and since 2011 jointly with Kavus Torabi
 'Allo 'Allo! actor Vicki Michelle
 Former Brentwood and Ongar MP Sir Eric Pickles
 Former leader of Brentwood Borough Council The Right Honourable Brandon Lewis, now Northern Ireland Secretary and Conservative MP for Great Yarmouth.  
 Sonny Jay Muharrem from The Loveable Rogues who presented on Phoenix FM for two years before moving to Capital FM
 Carter USM guitarist/songwriter Les "Fruitbat" Carter
 Boxer Rebellion drummer Piers Hewitt
 My Life Story singer Jake Shillingford
 Singer/songwriter Chris T-T
 Kula Shaker drummer Paul Winter-Hart
 The Others singer Dominic Masters
 Former music and football agent Eric Hall
 Former Essex cricketer Ian Pont

References

External links
Official site
Phoenix FM on Facebook
Phoenix FM on Twitter

Community radio stations in the United Kingdom
Radio stations in Essex
Radio stations established in 1996
Billericay
1996 establishments in England